Evergreen High School is a public high school located in Metamora, Ohio, United States.  It was first opened in 1968 and as of the 2021–22 school year, serves 348 students in grades 9-12.  Athletic teams are known as the Vikings and the school competes as a member of the Northwest Ohio Athletic League. Evergreen has many school organizations and clubs and the school is also partnered with Four-County Vocational School in Archbold, Ohio.

Notes and references

External links 

1968 establishments in Ohio
Educational institutions established in 1968
High schools in Fulton County, Ohio
Public high schools in Ohio